Albino Alverà (1 March 1923 – 26 October 2004) was an Italian alpine skier. He competed in the men's slalom at the 1952 Winter Olympics.

References

External links
 

1923 births
2004 deaths
Italian male alpine skiers
Olympic alpine skiers of Italy
Alpine skiers at the 1952 Winter Olympics
People from Cortina d'Ampezzo
Sportspeople from the Province of Belluno
20th-century Italian people